The 2009 Genuine Ford Parts Australian Formula Ford Championship was a CAMS sanctioned national motor racing title for drivers of Formula Ford open wheel racing cars. The championship was the 40th national series for Formula Fords to be held in Australia and the 17th to carry the Australian Formula Ford Championship name. It began on 26 March 2009 at the Albert Park Street Circuit and finished on 25 October at the Surfers Paradise Street Circuit after eight rounds held across four different states and territories. Round 1 was contested over two races and all other rounds over three races.

South Australian driver Nick Percat dominated the championship, winning 12 of the 23 races. At the Hidden Valley Raceway round, Percat set a new record for the most races wins in the history of national level Formula Ford racing in Australia.

Points
Championship points were awarded on a 20-16-14-12-10-8-6-4-2-1 basis to the top ten classified finishers in each race. An additional point was awarded to the driver gaining pole position for each round.

Teams and drivers
The following teams and drivers competed in the 2009 Australian Formula Ford Championship.

Race calendar and results

Drivers' championship standings

References

External links
 Official Australian Formula Ford website
 2009 Racing Results Archive
 2009 Australian Formula Ford Technical Regulations As archived at www.webcitation.org
 2009 Genuine Ford Parts Australian Formula Ford Championship Complete Pointscore As archived at www.webcitation.org 
 Reports and images from the 2009 Australian Formula Ford Championship

Australian Formula Ford Championship seasons
Formula Ford Championship